Agylla tolteca is a moth of the family Erebidae. It was described by William Schaus in 1889. It is found from Mexico to the Brazilian state of Santa Catarina.

References

Moths described in 1889
tolteca
Moths of North America
Moths of South America